Derya Seyhan Arman (born 26 February 1980) is a Turkish transgender rights activist, actress, and drag queen, based in Istanbul. She has appeared in Turkish media talking about her own experiences as a transgender person living in Turkey. She often appears in plays and media as a drag queen.

She started her acting career in theatre when she joined Adana Kardes Oyuncular theatre in 1994.

She appeared in Akasya Durağı. She won two awards, one for her movie I saw the sun (Güneşi Gördüm), in the best performance category, at the 23rd Singapore International Film Awards in 2010 and jury's choice award for her movie Other Angels (Teslimiyet) at the 22nd Ankara International Film Festival. She was one of the 100 women featured by the BBC in 2016.

Filmography

References

1980 births
Living people
BBC 100 Women
Turkish film actresses
Turkish television actresses
Turkish LGBT actors
Turkish LGBT rights activists
Turkish drag queens
Turkish transgender people
Transgender rights activists
People from Adana